is an ice hockey arcade game developed and released by Namco for Japan only in 1988. Up to four players control players from one of eight hockey teams against each other, the objective being to score the most points before the timer ends. Similar to Namco's own Final Lap, multiple cabinets can be linked together to enable multiplayer play. It runs on the Namco System 1 arcade board. Face Off received a favorable critical reception for its visuals and gameplay. A digital re-release for the Wii Virtual Console was released in Japan in 2009.

Gameplay

Face Off is an ice-hockey arcade game. Players select one of eight hockey teams (Canada, the Czech Republic, Finland, France, Japan, the Soviet Union, Sweden, United States) in two gameplay modes. Tournament Mode has one to two players face four CPU-controlled teams. Versus Mode enables up to four players competing against each other. Players can select how many players their team has.

Release
Face Off was released in Japan in December 1988. It runs on the Namco System 1 arcade system. Much like Namco's own Final Lap series, Face Off allows cabinets to be linked for four-player multiplayer.

Reception
In Japan, Game Machine listed Face Off on their February 1, 1989 issue as being the eighteenth most-successful table arcade unit of the month. The July 1991 issue of Gamest magazine was highly positive of the game, calling its character designs "cute" and labeling it one of Namco's more impressive titles in their late 1980s game output.

References

External links
Face Off at the Killer List of Videogames
Face Off on the Wii Virtual Console at IGN

1988 video games
Arcade video games
Ice hockey video games
Namco arcade games
Japan-exclusive video games
Video games developed in Japan
Virtual Console games